The 53rd Coast Artillery Regiment was  a Coast Artillery regiment in the United States Army. In World War I it was a railway artillery regiment in France. In World War II it was reactivated with mobile 155 mm guns.

History

 for WW.I. history with Railway guns see Obusier_de_400_Modèle_1915/1916#United_States_service
 for 1917 see Archibald_H._Sunderland#World_War_I
 for 1941 see Naval_Station_Argentia#Fort_McAndrew
 for 1942 see Pepperrell_Air_Force_Base#Wartime_operations
 for 1942 see Bermuda_Base_Command#US_Army_ground_forces_in_Bermuda

Lineage
Constituted in July 1917, under the designation of the 8th Provisional Regiment, Coast Artillery Corps at Fort Adams from the following companies:
 Headquarters and Supply Companies were the 5th Company, Fort Monroe, VA and Fort Story, VA. (Originally the 118th Co.)
 Battery A was the 1st, 2nd, 3rd, 4th, Company Fort Howard, Md. and 1st Company from Fort Smallwood.
 Battery B was the 10th Company at Fort Monroe, VA.
 Battery C was the 12th Company at Fort Monroe, VA.
 Battery D was the 11th Company at Fort Monroe, VA.
 Battery E was the 3rd Company at Fort Wadsworth, NY. (Originally the 114th Co.)
 Battery F was the 3rd Company Fort Hamilton, NY. (Originally the 84th Co.)
 Battery G was the 3rd Company from Fort Tilden
 Battery H was the 3rd Company Fort Moultrie, SC. (Originally the 78th Co.)
 Battery I was the 1st and 2nd Companies from Fort Hunt
 Battery K was the 1st 2nd 3rd 4th 5th Companies from Fort Washington
 Battery L was the 2nd Company Fort Caswell, NC. (Originally the 31st Co.)
 Battery M was the 2nd Company at Fort Screven, GA.
Arrived in France 25 September 1917 and redesignated as the 53rd Artillery (Coast Artillery Corps) on 5 February 1918. (In August 1918 the Railway Artillery Reserve was reconstructed and Coast Artillery Regiments reorganized to conform to standardized Field Artillery configurations)
 HHB as HHB
 Battery A as Battery A 53rd Artillery CAC
 Battery B as Battery B 53rd Artillery CAC
 Battery C as Battery C 53rd Artillery CAC
 Battery D as Battery D 53rd  Artillery CAC
 Battery E transferred to Provisional Howitzer Regiment, then to 51st Artillery CAC as Battery E
 Battery F transferred to 42nd Artillery CAC as Battery F
 Battery G transferred to Provisional Howitzer Regiment, then to 51st Artillery CAC as Battery F
 Battery H transferred to 42nd Artillery CAC as Battery E
 Battery I transferred to 52nd Artillery CAC as Battery E
 Battery K transferred to 52nd Artillery CAC as Battery F
 Battery L as E Battery 53rd Artillery CAC
 Battery M as F Battery 53rd Artillery CAC
Arrived from France at  Newport News, Virginia 11 March 1919 proceeded to Camp Stuart, Virginia then reassigned to Camp Eustis 17 and 18 March 1919.
 Inactivated 1 August 1921 at Camp Eustis
 Redesignated as 53rd Coast Artillery (RY) Regiment on 1 July 1924 (inactive)
 Demobilized in 1930
 Constituted as 53rd Coast Artillery (155mm Gun) on 9 July 1941
Activated on 20 July 1942 with personnel from Batteries HHB and E of 13th Coast Artillery at Camp Pendleton, Virginia.
 Battery A from A Battery 57th Coast artillery, at Newfoundland
 Battery B from B Battery 57th Coast artillery, at Bermuda
 Battery C from ??, at Goat Island, Jamaica
 A, B and C Batteries transferred back to Camp Pendleton less personnel and equipment and reactivated
 Battery D at Camp Pendleton
 Battery E at Camp Pendleton
 Battery F at Camp Pendleton
 Battery G (SL) from Battery G 57th Coast Artillery at Fort DuPont
 Battery H activated but 20 February 1942 inactivated and transferred to 27th Coast Artillery Battalion
On 16 October 1942 assigned to Eastern Defense Command.
 On 3 August 1943 53rd Artillery CAC reconstituted and consolidated with 53rd Coast Artillery (155mm Gun).
Regiment deactivated and broken up on 27 May 1944 at Camp Pendleton as follows-
 HHB as 153rd Coast Artillery Group
 1st Battalion redesignated 290th Coast Artillery Battalion
 2nd Battalion redesignated 291st Coast Artillery Battalion
 3rd Battalion redesignated 292nd Coast Artillery Battalion
 Battery G inactivated and disbanded 5 June 1944

Coat of arms

Blazon
 Shield
Or, on a pile Gules crusily fitchy of the field a fleur-de-lis of the like.
 Crest
On a wreath of the colors Or and Gules, an oozlefinch Vert, beaked, capped and collared on legs Or, in front of an epie of the last. Motto   JE FRAPPE (I Strike).

Symbolism
 Shield
The regiment had its baptism of fire at Royammeix, France, near Commercy and was in St. Mihiel (also near Commercy) and the Meuse-Argonne operations near Verdun, all being in the province of Lorraine.  The shield is gold as in the arms of Lorraine.  The red pile is for artillery, scattered with cross crosslets fitchy from the arms of Commercy and charged with one gold fleur-de-lis from the arms of Verdun.
 Crest
The oozlefinch and epie in the crest are both taken from the shoulder sleeve insignia worn by Railway Artillery Reserve, of which this regiment was a unit.

Background
The coat of arms was approved on 5 March 1929.

There was no distinctive unit insignia approved for this unit.

Campaign streamers
unknown

Decorations
unknown

References

 
 Gaines, William C., Coast Artillery Organizational History, 1917-1950, Regular Army regiments, Coast Defense Journal, vol. 23, issue 2
 
  CMH lineage
  page 123
 Artillery Journal

External links
 http://www.history.army.mil/html/forcestruc/lh.html
 http://freepages.military.rootsweb.ancestry.com/~cacunithistories/53rd_Arty.html

053
Military units and formations established in 1917
Military units and formations disestablished in 1921
History of the United States Army in Bermuda
Military units and formations in Bermuda in World War II
Military units and formations established in 1941
Military units and formations disestablished in 1944